Neruda is a crater on Mercury. It has a diameter of 112 kilometers. Its name was adopted by the International Astronomical Union (IAU) in 2008. Neruda is named for the Chilean poet Pablo Neruda, who lived from 1904 to 1973.

To the northeast of Neruda is Sher-Gil crater.  Further to the northwest are Grainger and Beckett craters.

References

Impact craters on Mercury
Pablo Neruda